Dean Bradley Hall (born 2 September 1977) is a South African former professional rugby player. He played on the wing. He played the majority of his career for the Johannesburg based teams, the Golden Lions in the Currie Cup and Vodacom Cup and the Cats in Super Rugby. He was also capped thirteen times for the Springboks and scored four test tries. His career was hampered with injury and he never reached his full potential. He was quite large for a wing, but in the wake of Jonah Lomu's sensation at the 1995 Rugby World Cup, it was hoped that Dean Hall would become the Springbok's massive wing.

Early life and youth career
Dean Hall was born in Springs, in the Gauteng Province of South Africa on 2 September 1977. He went to Selection Park Primary School and then to Springs Boys High School. He played for Pirates Rugby Club in Gauteng. In 1996 Hall was selected for the South Africa U/23 team. He got selected for the under 23's again in 2000 when they competed in the African Rugby Championships. In 1997 and 1998 he played for the Golden Lions U/21 team, even though he got selected for the Golden Lions' senior team to play in the Currie Cup as early as 1997.

Senior career

1997 to 1998
In 1997 while still eligible for age-group rugby, Hall was selected in the Golden Lions senior squad for the Currie Cup. He was not selected in the senior team in 1998, but continued to play for the Golden Lions U/21 team.

1999 to 2000
Hall started playing Currie Cup rugby in 1999 and became a regular starter for the Golden Lions in the Currie Cup as well as the Vodacom Cup. In 2000 he was selected for the Cat's Super Rugby squad. He went on to play 26 Super Rugby games for the Cats. He scored 20 tries for the Golden Lions in the Currie Cup season, which is fifth on the list of most tries scored in a season by a Lions player. In 1999, while Hall was part of the Golden Lions' team, they won the Currie Cup. Hall came on as a replacement during the final, which the Lions won 33-9 against the Sharks in Durban.

2001
In 2001 Hall continued to play Super Rugby for the Cats and gained instant fame when he flattened Highlanders back Iliesa Tanivula on his way to the tryline. This good form resulted in him being selected for the Springboks, ahead of veteran winger Pieter Rossouw. Jake White who was the Springboks' assistant coach at the time mentioned that Hall selection was to increase the skill level of the team in general and was viewed as a powerful statement of intent of Bok coach Harry Viljoen's plan to utilise the full width of the pitch in his game plan. On 16 June 2001, Hall made his test debut against  at his home ground, Ellis Park in Johannesburg. The Springboks lost the game 23-32. Hall was again in the team the following week at Kings Park in Durban when the Springboks changed it around and ran out winners, 20-15.

Hall played in all South Africa's Tri Nations games of 2001 Tri Nations Series, but failed to score a try. He was also selected for the Springboks' end of year tour to France, Italy, England and the USA.

2002 to 2004
From 2002 to 2003 Hall continued to play Currie Cup rugby for the Golden Lions and Super Rugby for the Cats. He was selected to play in the South Africa A team which faced Argentina on 26 June 2002 in Witbank. A game South Africa A won 42-36, thanks to two tries scored by Hall. One of these tries came three minutes after the final hooter, to deny the Argentinians victory. Argentina led 36-35 before Hall's try. Paulse, coming back from injury, struggled with his form in the tests against Wales and Argentina and was replaced by Hall for the test against  at Loftus Versfeld in Pretoria on 6 July 2002. Hall scored 2 tries in a 60-18 victory for the Springboks. He also played in the first Tri Nations game of the season, against the All Blacks at Westpac Stadium in Wellington. South Africa lost this game 41-20 with Hall picking up an injury. He was replaced by Paulse the following game against  in Brisbane. Hall played both games during the home leg of the tournament against Australia and New Zealand. The game against Australia on 17 August 2002 at Ellis Park turned out to be his last game in a Springbok jersey. Although he was part of the Golden Lions' Currie Cup squad during 2002, he was injured before the Currie Cup semi final and subsequently did not go on tour with the Springboks for their 2002 end of year tour.

In 2003 he was recovering from a serious knee injury. He formed part of the Cats' Super Rugby squad, but injuries kept him on the sidelines for the majority of his remaining career. He never fully recovered from this serious knee injury and was never again selected for the Springboks. According to one doctor who examined him in 2002, his knee cartilage had turned into that of a pensioners.

2005 to 2007
He was included in the Sharks' Super Rugby squad for 2005, but failed to make the team for any Super Rugby match. In 2006 he played Vodacom Cup rugby for the Natal Wildebeest and was part of the Currie Cup squad. In total he played seven games for the Durban-based team, including a Sharks Invitational XV who faced the Western Force in Pietermaritzburg in June 2006 in preparation for the Currie Cup.

At the start of the 2006/2007 Japanese season, Hall joined the Ricoh Black Rams in Japan. Hall went on to earn 12 caps for Ricoh during the season.

After retirement
Hall has remained involved with rugby, being involved in rugby development in previously disadvantaged communities. In 2011 he was also involved in an Advanced Players and Coaches course at St Stithians College in Bryanston, hosted by The Investec International Rugby Academy, where young rugby players aged 16 to 18 spent time with top coaches and players.

He currently runs his own business Solo chemicals in Johannesburg

Honours
Golden Lions
Currie Cup: 1999

References

External links
 

1977 births
Living people
Black Rams Tokyo players
Golden Lions players
Sharks (Currie Cup) players
Lions (United Rugby Championship) players
Sharks (rugby union) players
South African rugby union players
South Africa international rugby union players
People from Springs, Gauteng
White South African people
South African people of British descent
South African expatriate rugby union players
Expatriate rugby union players in Japan
South African expatriate sportspeople in Japan
Rugby union wings
Rugby union players from Gauteng